Licracantha formicaria is a species of beetle in the family Cerambycidae, the only species in the genus Licracantha.

References

Tillomorphini
Monotypic beetle genera